Viled is the third compilation of the trilogy released by Babes in Toyland. The previous two were Lived and Devil.  Viled was produced by Tim Mac, and released May 2000 by Almafame.

Track listing
All songs by Babes in Toyland (except Tracks 16 and 17)

Swamp Pussy (demo)
House (Subpop Single Club Single)
Arriba (House's B-side)
Flesh Crawl (Compilation Contribution)
Dirty (Compilation Contribution)
Watching Girl (Compilation Contribution)
Handsome and Gretel (demo)/Single
Pearl (demo)/"Handsome and Gretel" Single B-side
Blood (recorded at Amsterdam Melkweg; July 8, 1994)
Sometimes (demo)/Angel Hair
Hello (demo)
Sweet 69 (demo)
Eye Rise (demo)/Ariel
22 (recorded at Amsterdam Melkweg; July 8, 1994)
Peek-A-Boo Street (Nemesisters outtake)
We Are Family (demo)
The Girl Can't Help It (demo)/(compilation Contribution)
Astroantiquity (demo)

Trivia
The official version of The Girl Can't Help It is on Fast Track to Nowhere: Songs from "Rebel Highway" and Astroaniquity is on Witchblade
"Flesh Crawl" is on "Teriyaki Asthma Vols. I-V"
"Dirty" is on "Milk for Pussy"
"Watching Girl" is on "Every Band Has A Shonen Knife Who Loves Them"

Personnel
Kat Bjelland   -  Guitar, vocals
Lori Barbero   -  drums, vocals on Tracks 6 and 16
Maureen Herman  -  Bass on Tracks 5 and 9-18
Michelle Leon  -  Bass on Tracks  1-4, 6, 7, and 8

References

Babes in Toyland (band) compilation albums
2000 compilation albums
Demo albums